Wilfred Hartland Craddy (1 September 1905 – 4 January 1979) was an English cricketer, a left-handed batsman born in Bristol.

Craddy made his debut for Gloucestershire in the 1928 County Championship against Glamorgan.  He paid two further first-class matches for Gloucestershire in 1928, against Sussex and Northamptonshire. In his three first-class matches, Craddy scored 47 runs at a batting average of 9.40, with a high score of 29.

He died in Westbury-on-Trym, Bristol on 4 January 1979.

References

External links
Wilfred Caddy at ESPNcricinfo
Wilfred Caddy at CricketArchive

1905 births
1979 deaths
Cricketers from Bristol
English cricketers
Gloucestershire cricketers